Rowland is an unincorporated community in Cedar County, in the U.S. state of Missouri.

History
A post office called Rowland was established in 1898, and remained in operation until 1906. The community has the name of R. P. Rowland, the original owner of the town site.

References

Unincorporated communities in Cedar County, Missouri
Unincorporated communities in Missouri